SLF may refer to:

Seattle Liberation Front, anti-Vietnam War organization
Shuttle Landing Facility, for the Space Shuttle
Social Liberal Forum, UK
Spotted lanternfly, an insect native to parts of China, India, and Vietnam, and recently invading parts of the eastern USA
Stiff Little Fingers, Northern Irish punk band
Subscriber Location Function in IP Multimedia Subsystem
Sun Life Financial, Canada
Super low frequency electromagnetic waves
Superior longitudinal fasciculus, an association fiber tract in the brain
UD SLF, a bus